Eva Östlund, better known by her stage name Eva Eastwood (born in Örebro, Sweden, on 25 September 1967), is a Swedish songwriter and singer who sings rockabilly and rock 'n' roll songs.

Although she was offered a contract in the United States in 1997, she chose to go back home and soon after formed the band The Major Keys and made releases crediting Eva Eastwood and the Major Keys through the small Tail Records label based in Jönköping

In 2005, she took part in Allsång på Skansen, a sing-along TV show from Skansen performing "Vårt liv i repris" from her album En ny stil i stan proving to be a turning point in her career. Eva won the Millencolin Music Prize 2010 becoming the first woman to do so. In 2011, she returned to the same stage singing the title track "Lyckost" from her similarly named album. 

As a songwriter, she has composed over 800 songs, including the likes of The Boppers, Linda Gail Lewis, Lalla Hansson, Berth Idoffs, Jerry Williams and Larz-Kristerz.

Discography

Albums
1999: Good Things Can Happen
2001: The Good Life I Have
2001: Hot Chicks & Cool Cats
2003: Roots Revival
2021: Candy

Singles

References

External links 
Facebook
Website

Swedish women singers
Swedish songwriters
Living people
1967 births
People from Örebro